Ydrissa M'Barke (born 30 March 1983 in Rouen, France) is a French athlete who specialises in the 400 meters. M'Barke competed at the 2008 Summer Olympics.

References 
 sports reference

French male sprinters
Sportspeople from Rouen
Olympic athletes of France
Athletes (track and field) at the 2008 Summer Olympics
1983 births
Living people
European Athletics Championships medalists
Mediterranean Games silver medalists for France
Mediterranean Games medalists in athletics
Athletes (track and field) at the 2005 Mediterranean Games